Neuronal pentraxin-1 (NP1) is a protein that in humans is encoded by the NPTX1 gene.

Function 

NPTX1 is a member of the neuronal pentraxin gene family. Neuronal pentraxin 1 is similar to the rat NP1 gene which encodes a binding protein for the snake venom toxin taipoxin. Human NPTX1 mRNA is exclusively localized to the nervous system.

References

Further reading